Roland Ströhm (2 March 1928 – 20 October 2017) was a Swedish cyclist. He competed in the individual and team road race events at the 1956 Summer Olympics.

References

External links
 

1928 births
2017 deaths
Swedish male cyclists
Olympic cyclists of Sweden
Cyclists at the 1956 Summer Olympics
Sportspeople from Västernorrland County